Feo-Gasy is a band from Madagascar that perform a traditional ba-gasy music of the Merina people of the rural central highlands around the capital city of Antananarivo. The band was founded in 1994 by superstar guitarist Erick Manana and featured until his 2001 death the iconic sodina player Rakoto Frah, the only Malagasy musician ever to be featured on the local currency. The group was originally composed of the acoustic guitarist and singer Erick Manana, the sodina player and singer Rakoto Frah, singer and guitarist Jean-Colbert Ranaivoarison ("Rakôly"), vocalists Famantsoa Rajaonarison ("Fafa") and François-Daniel Rabeanirainy ("Beny"), and valiha player Bariliva Rasoavatsara, who died in December 2012.

Discography

See also
Music of Madagascar

Notes

Malagasy musical groups